Transaction Management eXecutive or TMX was NCR Corporation's proprietary transaction processing system running on NCR Tower 5000-series systems which were based on Motorola 680xx CPUs. This system was used mainly by financial institutions in the 1980s and 1990s.

Features
Basic features of the TMX operating system are listed below:

 It was a multiuser, multitasking 32-bit operating system.
 It featured a proprietary network called LBN (Local Branch Network).
 Later versions of TMX had Token Ring support which was called LBN Emulation.
 It had device support for financial applications on LBN, e.g. NCR dumb terminals, passbook printers, cash dispensers, magnetic stripe reader and pinpad.
 It contained SNA LU emulations for mainframe connectivity.
 Peripheral device configuration was fixed during boot time. Configuration changes were made using the SYSGEN command.
 It supported a flat file system; there were no subdirectories. File name format was like this: diskname:usernumber.catalogname.filename.ext;version
 Files had various types, like text files and index sequential data files.
 Main programming language was Whitesmiths C, but the compiler was not ANSI C compliant.
 It had limited memory (several MB) and disk (several hundred MB).

NCR Tower 5000 systems were also capable of running UNIX SVR3 version.

References 

Discontinued operating systems
Proprietary operating systems
NCR Corporation products